is a Japanese actress who has appeared in a number of feature films, television series and variety shows. She is also a singer under the name Nanami. She is represented by the agency Nanami office.

Filmography

TV dramas

Variety

Films

Sanuki Film Festival Planning Films

Radio

Others

Advertisements

Bibliography

DVD

Discography

References

External links 

 – official site 

Japanese actresses
Actors from Kagawa Prefecture
1981 births
People from Takamatsu, Kagawa
Living people